Antiscopa is a genus of moths of the family Crambidae. It was first described by Eugene Munroe in 1964. This genus is endemic to New Zealand. The type species of this genus is Antiscopa epicomia.

Species
This genus contains the following species:
Antiscopa acompa (Meyrick, 1884)
Antiscopa elaphra (Meyrick, 1884)
Antiscopa epicomia (Meyrick, 1884)

References

Scopariinae
Crambidae genera
Taxa named by Eugene G. Munroe
Endemic fauna of New Zealand
Endemic moths of New Zealand